Jack Johnson (12 March 1926 – 29 January 2008) was an Australian rules footballer who played with Essendon in the Victorian Football League (VFL). His career with Essendon finished when he joined the Navy where he served from 1947 until 1962.

Notes

External links 		
		

Essendon Football Club past player profile
		
		
		
		
1926 births
2008 deaths
Australian rules footballers from Victoria (Australia)
Essendon Football Club players
Royal Australian Navy personnel